Michael John Wilk (born circa 1961 in Chicopee, Massachusetts) is an American keyboardist, songwriter, and record producer best known for his contributions to John Kay and Steppenwolf largely as a keyboardist and bass player.  He has also worked with Boz Scaggs, Mick Fleetwood, Christine McVie, Billy Burnette, Phil Seymour, Danny Hutton, the Pointer Sisters, Tom Scott, and the actor Scott Baio.  Working with Steve Cropper of Booker T. & the M.G.'s and the Blues Brothers, Wilk performed and recorded the music for the movie Satisfaction. Wilk also worked on the Pretty In Pink soundtrack and has worked on television commercials.  He worked as a sound technician with The University of Alabama Million Dollar Band until 2018, and teaches Pro Tools Tuesdays & Thursdays each week as an adjunct in the UA School of Music.

See also
 Wilk – people with the surname Wilk

References

External links

American rock keyboardists
1952 births
Living people
People from Chicopee, Massachusetts
Steppenwolf (band) members
21st-century American keyboardists
20th-century American keyboardists